Friedrich Adolf Krummacher (July 13, 1767 – April 14, 1845) was a German Reformed theologian and a writer of devotional poetry and prose.

Biography
He was born in Tecklenburg, Westphalia. Having studied theology at Lingen and Halle, he became successively rector of the grammar school at Moers (1793), a professor of theology at the University of Duisburg (1800), a preacher in Kettwig (1807), Consistorialrath and superintendent in Bernburg (1812), and, after declining an invitation to the University of Bonn, pastor of the Ansgariuskirche in Bremen (1824). He died in Bremen.

Literary works
He was the author of many religious works, but is best known by his Parabeln (1805; 9th edition 1876; English translation 1844). In 1858, they were added to Bohn's "Illustrated Library", with 40 illustrations.

Hymnus an die Liebe, 1801 
Parabeln, 3 volumes, 1805–1817 
Über den Geist und die Form der evangelischen Geschichte in historischer und ästhetischer Hinsicht, 1805 ("On the Spirit and Form of Evangelical History in its Historical and Æsthetical Relations").
Die Kinderwelt, 1809 
Festbüchlein, Tl. 1-3, 1808–1819 
Apologen und Paramythien, 1809 
Das Wörtlein: Und, eine Geburtstagsfeier, 1811 
Der Eroberer, eine Verwandlung, 1814 
Johannes, 1815 
Apostolisches Sendschreiben an die Christengemeinden von dem was noth thut zur Kirchenverbesserung, 1815 (anonym) 
Leiden, Sterben und Auferstehung unseres Herrn Jesu Christi, 1818 ("The Suffering, Death, and Resurrection of Our Lord Jesus Christ").
Fürst Wolfgang zu Anhalt, eine Reformationspredigt, 1820 
Briefwechsel zwischen Asmus und seinem Vetter, 1820 
Die freie evangelische Kirche, ein Friedensgruß, 1821 
Bilder und Bildchen, 1823 
Katechismus der christlichen Lehre, 1823 
Die christliche Volksschule im Bunde mit der Kirche, 1823 
St. Ansgar, 1826 
Das Täubchen, 1828 
Der Hauptmann Cornelius, 1829; Cornelius the Centurion, (translated into English, Edinburgh, 1841).
Die Geschichte des Reiches Gottes nach der heiligen Schrift, andeutender Text zu von Kügelgens, 1831–45. 
Das Leben des heiligen Johannes, 1833 The life and character of St. John, the Evangelist and Apostle, (translated into English, Edinburgh, 1839).
Selbstbiographie, 1869
Briefe. Nachlese (posthumous), 1911.

Arnold Wilhelm Möller published his life and letters: Friedrich Adolf Krummacher und seine Freunde, 2 volumes, Bonn, 1849.

Das Alpenlied

Auf hoher Alp
Wohnt auch der liebe Gott,
Er färbt den Morgen rot,
Die Blümlein weiß und blau,
Und labet sie mit Tau.
Auf hoher Alp ein lieber Vater wohnt.

Auf hoher Alp
Der Hirt sein Heerdlein schaut;
Sein Herz Gott vertraut;
Der Geiß und Lamm ernährt,
Ihm auch wohl gern beschert.
Auf hoher Alp ein lieber Vater wohnt!

(From "Das Alpenlied" ("The alpine song") by Friedrich Adolf Krummacher)

Alpine Heights

On Alpine heights 
    The love of God is shed;	
    He paints the morning red,	
    The flowerets white and blue,	
    And feeds them with his dew.	
On Alpine heights a loving Father dwells.	
   
On Alpine heights 
    The herdsman tends his herd;	
    His shepherd is the Lord;	
    For he who feeds the sheep	
    Will sure his offspring keep.	
On Alpine heights a loving Father dwells.

(A translation of F.A. Krummacher's "Das Alpenlied" by Charles Timothy Brooks)

Family
His brother Gottfried Daniel Krummacher was the leader of the pietists of Wuppertal. His son Friedrich Wilhelm Krummacher was a noted clergyman and author, as was his son Emil Wilhelm Krummacher.

References

Sources
  This work in turn cites:
Selbstbiographie (Autobiography, 1869)
Maria Krummacher, Unser Grossvater (Our grandfather, Bielefeld, 1891)
 
Attribution:
 

1767 births
1845 deaths
People from Tecklenburg
German Calvinist and Reformed theologians
University of Halle alumni
People from Saxony-Anhalt
19th-century Calvinist and Reformed theologians
19th-century German Protestant theologians
19th-century German male writers
19th-century German writers
German male non-fiction writers